Dreamers Are Waiting is the seventh studio album by Australian rock band Crowded House, released on 4 June 2021 through EMI Music Australia. It is their first studio album since 2010's Intriguer, with the band reuniting with producer Mitchell Froom, who is now also the band's keyboardist, for the first time since Recurring Dream (1996). It is also Crowded House's first album with Neil Finn's sons Liam and Elroy as members of the group.

The album was preceded by the singles "Whatever You Want", released in October 2020, "To the Island" in February 2021, and "Playing with Fire" in May 2021.

Crowded House embarked on the Island tour of New Zealand in March 2021. The group have announced plans to tour the UK and Europe in support of the album in 2022.

At the 2021 ARIA Music Awards, the album won Best Adult Contemporary Album.

Background and recording
Neil Finn stated that he wanted to wait until there was a "fresh and authentic way to re-approach" recording as Crowded House, as he was "afraid of just repeating the same formulas". The album was primarily recorded in Los Angeles before the 2020 COVID-19 lockdowns, but was finished remotely.

Track listing

Personnel
Neil Finn – vocals, guitars, piano, keyboards, percussion
Nick Seymour – bass, vocals, keyboards
Liam Finn – guitar, vocals, drums
Elroy Finn – drums, vocals, guitar, keyboards
Mitchell Froom – keyboards

Charts

Weekly charts

Year-end charts

References

2021 albums
Albums produced by Mitchell Froom
ARIA Award-winning albums
BMG Rights Management albums
Crowded House albums
EMI Records albums